is a railway station in the city of Aisai, Aichi Prefecture, Japan , operated by Meitetsu.

Lines

Station layout
The station has two opposed side platforms, connected by an overpass. The platforms are not even: the platform for trains in the direction of Nagoya is longer, and can accommodate trains of eight carriages in length, whereas the opposing platform is shorter, and can accommodate trains of only up to six carriages.

Platforms

Adjacent stations

Station history
Shobata Station was opened on January 23, 1914.

Passenger statistics
In fiscal 2017, the station was used by an average of 4,523 passengers daily (boarding passengers only).

Surrounding area
Shobata Elementary School
Shobata Castle ruins

See also
 List of Railway Stations in Japan

References

External links

 Official web page 

Railway stations in Japan opened in 1914
Railway stations in Aichi Prefecture
Stations of Nagoya Railroad
Aisai, Aichi